The 22459 / 22460 Madhupur - Anand Vihar Terminal Humsafar Express (also known as Baba Baidyanath Dham Humsafar Express) is a Superfast express train of the Humsafar Express category belonging to Indian Railways - Eastern Railway zone that runs between  and  in India.

It is operated as train number 22459 from Madhupur Junction to Anand Vihar Terminal and as train number 22460 in the reverse direction serving the states of Jharkhand, Bihar, Uttar Pradesh & Delhi.

Coaches 
The train comprises 16 3-tier AC, 2 Sleeper LHB coach along with two generator cars at each end. It has two screens in each coach displaying information about upcoming stations and passenger awareness. It is also equipped with CCTV cameras in each coach to ensure passenger safety.

Service 

Traction
Both trains are hauled by a Ghaziabad (GZB) based WAP 7 locomotive on its entire journey.

Route and halts 

References

External links 
 https://indiarailinfo.com/train/110633

Humsafar Express trains
Transport in Delhi
Transport in Deoghar
Rail transport in Delhi
Rail transport in Bihar
Rail transport in Uttar Pradesh
Rail transport in Jharkhand
Railway services introduced in 2020